Taurhina stanley is a beetle belonging to the family Scarabaeidae.

Description
This species is quite variable in size and colours.

Distribution
This species can be found in Kenya, Cameroon and Uganda.

List of subspecies
 Neptunides stanleyi camerunensis (de Lisle, 1947)
 Neptunides stanleyi elgonensis Allard, 1985
 Neptunides stanleyi meridionalis Allard, 1985

Etymology
The name honours the explorer of Central Africa Henry Morton Stanley .

References
 Biolib

External links
 Beetles of Africa
 Skytropic

stanley
Insects of Kenya
Beetles described in 1889
Taxa named by Oliver Erichson Janson